National Conservation Lands, formally known as the National Landscape Conservation System, is a  collection of lands in 873 federally recognized areas considered to be the crown jewels of the American West.  These lands represent 10% of the  managed by the Bureau of Land Management (BLM). The BLM is the largest federal public land manager and is responsible for over 40% of all the federal public land in the nation. The other major federal public land managers include the US Forest Service (USFS), National Park Service (NPS), and the US Fish and Wildlife Service (USFWS).

Over the years, the Bureau of Land Management has had to adjust its approach to public land management to fit the changing needs of the nation. The BLM historically has managed lands under its jurisdiction for extractive uses, such as mining, logging, grazing, and oil and gas production. In 1983, Congress acknowledged the value of watersheds, wildlife habitat, recreation, scenery, scientific exploration and other non-extractive uses with the designation of the first BLM-managed wilderness area—the Bear Trap Canyon unit of the Lee Metcalf Wilderness in Montana. In 1996, President Clinton underscored non-extractive priorities on BLM lands when he established the first national monument to be administered by the BLM—the Grand Staircase-Escalante National Monument in southern Utah. With this and several similar designations, a new focus emerged that would become part of how the agency looks at the land it manages: the protection of special areas where conservation and restoration of the landscape and its biological or cultural resources is the overriding objective.

The Bureau of Land Management's National Landscape Conservation System, better known as the National Conservation Lands, was created in 2000 with the mission to "conserve, protect, and restore these nationally significant landscapes that have outstanding cultural, ecological, and scientific values for the benefit of current and future generations."

There are eleven federal conservation designations for the units that make up the National Conservation Lands:

 National Monument
 National Conservation Area
 Wilderness Area
 Wilderness Study Area
 National Wild and Scenic River
 National Scenic Trail
 National Historic Trail
 Cooperative Management and Protection Area
 Forest Reserve
 Outstanding Natural Area
 National Scenic Area

The Conservation System was created in 2000, but without Congressional authorization, there was no guarantee that the System would be permanent. The National Landscape Conservation System Act was signed into law in March 2009 as part of the Omnibus Public Land Management Act of 2009. The Act permanently unified the individual units as a public lands System, protecting the System in law so that it would no longer exist at the pleasure of each president. This marked the first new congressionally authorized public lands system in decades.

The act also added  of new designations to the System, including a National Monument, three National Conservation Areas, Wilderness, Wild and Scenic Rivers and National Scenic Trails.

List of National Conservation Lands areas

National monuments 

28 sites totaling

National conservation areas (NCAs) 
17 sites totaling

BLM wilderness areas 

221 sites totaling ; excludes wilderness associated with other agencies

Wilderness study areas 

National historic trails 

11 sites totaling 

Distances and states are noted for BLM lands only.

National scenic trails 

5 units totaling 

Distances and states are noted for BLM lands only.

National wild and scenic rivers 

38 sites, totaling

Other

See also 
 Protected areas of the United States
 List of national conservation lands in Colorado
 List of national monuments of the United States

References

External links 

 BLM.gov: Official National Landscape Conservation System website
 BLM.gov: Complete list of wilderness study areas
 Conservation Lands Foundation
 Americanhiking.org: American Hiking Society Western Public Lands Initiative

 01
Bureau of Land Management

01
Conservation Lands
Protected areas of the United States
Landscape
Land management in the United States